Cladonia compressa is a species of lichen in the family Cladoniaceae. Found in Bolivia, it was formally described as a new species in 2016 by lichenologists Teuvo Ahti and Adam Flakus. Here, in a Yungas secondary cloud forest, the lichen was found growing on the ground, in humus-rich mineral soil. The specific epithet compressa refers to the compressed podetia. Secondary compounds that occur in the lichen include fumarprotocetraric acid (major), and minor to trace amounts of protocetraric acid and physodalic acid.

See also
List of Cladonia species

References

compressa
Lichen species
Lichens described in 2016
Lichens of Bolivia
Taxa named by Teuvo Ahti
Taxa named by Adam Grzegorz Flakus